Nəcəfqulubəyli (also, Nəcəfqulubəjli and Nadzhafkulubeyli) is a village and municipality in the Barda Rayon of Azerbaijan.  It has a population of 499.

References

Populated places in Barda District